Pericyma mendax is a moth of the  family Noctuidae. It is found most countries in subtropical Africa south of the Sahara, in Cape Verde, Mauritius, La Réunion and Madagascar.

It has a wingspan of approx. 40mm.  Host plants of the larvae are Acacia mearnsii and Acacia sp. Fabaceae

References
 Walker, 1858b. List of the Specimens of Lepidopterous Insects in the Collection of the British Museum. Part XIII.– Noctuidae. - 13 (1957):i–iv, 1521–1888

External links
 Boldsystems.org: Pictures of Pericyma mendax

Ophiusina
Moths described in 1858
Moths of Cape Verde
Moths of Africa
Moths of Madagascar
Moths of Mauritius
Moths of the Middle East
Moths of Réunion